Cyriocosmus is a genus of tarantulas that was first described by Eugène Louis Simon in 1903. They are small to medium spiders, with a bicolored or one same color carapace.

Diagnosis 
It differs from all other tarantulas by the paraembolic apophysis in the palpal bulbs of males, and a spermatheca with two spiral receptacles, which usually end in a caliciform or globular extension. Except for C. nogueiranetoi, which owns a S shape extension. All the species also own type 3 urticating hairs.

Species
 it contains twenty-three species, found in South America, on Tobago, and Trinidad:
Cyriocosmus aueri Kaderka, 2016 – Peru
Cyriocosmus bertae Pérez-Miles, 1998 – Brazil
Cyriocosmus bicolor (Schiapelli & Gerschman, 1945) – Brazil
Cyriocosmus blenginii Pérez-Miles, 1998 – Bolivia
Cyriocosmus elegans (Simon, 1889) – Venezuela, Trinidad and Tobago
Cyriocosmus fasciatus (Mello-Leitão, 1930) – Brazil
Cyriocosmus fernandoi Fukushima, Bertani & da Silva, 2005 – Brazil
Cyriocosmus foliatus Kaderka, 2019 – Peru
Cyriocosmus giganteus Kaderka, 2016 – Peru
Cyriocosmus hoeferi Kaderka, 2016 – Brazil
Cyriocosmus itayensis Kaderka, 2016 – Peru
Cyriocosmus leetzi Vol, 1999 – Colombia, Venezuela
Cyriocosmus nicholausgordoni Kaderka, 2016 – Venezuela
Cyriocosmus nogueiranetoi Fukushima, Bertani & da Silva, 2005 – Brazil
Cyriocosmus paredesi Kaderka, 2019 – Peru
Cyriocosmus perezmilesi Kaderka, 2007 – Bolivia
Cyriocosmus peruvianus Kaderka, 2016 – Peru
Cyriocosmus pribiki Pérez-Miles & Weinmann, 2009 – Peru
Cyriocosmus ritae Pérez-Miles, 1998 – Peru, Brazil
Cyriocosmus sellatus (Simon, 1889) (type) – Peru, Brazil
Cyriocosmus venezuelensis Kaderka, 2010 – Venezuela
Cyriocosmus versicolor (Simon, 1897) – Paraguay, Argentina
Cyriocosmus williamlamari Kaderka, 2016 – Venezuela

In synonymy 
C. chicoi Pérez-Miles, 1998 = Cyriocosmus bicolor 
C. planus (Fischel, 1927) = Cyriocosmus elegans 
C. rogerioi Pérez-Miles & Weinmann, 2009 = Cyriocosmus pribiki 
C. semifasciatus Mello-Leitão, 1939 = Cyriocosmus elegans

Transferred to other genera 

 Cyriocosmus butantan Pérez-Miles, 1998 →  Hapalopus butantan
 Cyriocosmus nigriventris Mello-Leitão, 1939 → Hapalopus nigriventris

See also
 List of Theraphosidae species

References

External links

Theraphosidae
Theraphosidae genera
Spiders of South America